Mayordomo or Chocolate Mayordomo is a brand of Mexican  (English: "table chocolate") produced by the company Chocolate Mayordomo De Oaxaca, S. De R.L. De C.V., and based in Oaxaca, Oaxaca, Mexico. The company manufactures mole sauce in addition to table chocolate.

History 

The company was founded in 1956.

Products 

Unlike many other commercial chocolates, Mayordomo includes only four ingredients, sugar, roasted cacao beans, almonds and cinnamon.  These ingredients are ground and blended forming a paste that is pressed into bars and discs.

Due to its undissolved granulated sugar, and its rough and gritty texture, the table chocolate is not meant to be eaten like a chocolate bar, although Mayordomo bars can be eaten out of hand. The bars and discs are primarily used to make hot cocoa in traditional Mexican form. Chocolate Mayordomo is prepared on the stove by dissolving the squares in hot milk or water, then whisking the cocoa with a molinillo or wire whisk. In Mexico, in the traditional Aztec and Mayan form, chile peppers are added to make both sweet and savory dishes.

See also
 List of chocolate drinks
 List of bean-to-bar chocolate manufacturers

References

External links
Chocolate Mayordomo website 
Fodor's Travel Review

Brand name chocolate
Mexican chocolate
Mexican drinks
Mexican chocolate companies
Companies based in Oaxaca
Mexican brands